View of Notre-Dame (French: Une vue de Notre-Dame) is an oil painting by Henri Matisse from 1914.

Experimental period
Along with works such as Woman on a High Stool, it belongs to the "experimental period" of Matisse's oeuvre. Pentimenti reveal that it was originally painted in a more detailed manner before it was radically simplified into a geometric composition.

Exhibition
It was not exhibited until after Matisse's death, but proved a great influence upon later developments in painting. Specifically, it is said to have considerably influenced American artists who developed new modern and abstract styles, i.e. Color field and Abstract Expressionism, such as Richard Diebenkorn.

Notes

References

External links
Roberta Smith in The New York Times on Matisse and View of Notre Dame

Paintings by Henri Matisse
Paintings in the collection of the Museum of Modern Art (New York City)
1914 paintings
Churches in art
Notre-Dame de Paris